Minthoplagia is a genus of parasitic flies in the family Tachinidae.

Species
Minthoplagia gracilens (Giglio-Tos, 1893)
Minthoplagia rafaeli Townsend, 1915
Minthoplagia setifrons (Wulp, 1890)

References

Dexiinae
Diptera of South America
Diptera of North America
Tachinidae genera
Taxa named by Charles Henry Tyler Townsend